Echinocystis  macrocarpaMicrampelis leptocarpa.

Marah macrocarpa (sometimes spelled Marah macrocarpus), known as chilicothe, wild cucumber, manroot or bigroot is a species of plant in the genus Marah.

Description

Marah macrocarpa has the most pubescent shoots, stems, and leaves of all the Marah species native to California - this being consistent with its range having the most xeric climate. The subspecies M. m. major of the Channel Islands (California)  is about twice as large in all of its parts. For example,the mainland  leaves  are 5 to 10 centimeters wide while the insular leaves are 15 to 25 centimeters in width. And the seeds on the mainland are 15 to 20 millimeters long while the  insular seeds are  28 to 33 millimeters in length.

Weights of up to 500 pounds (227 kilograms) have been reported. Vines develop leaves and, particularly, flowers and fruit very quickly, often with the first nodes of the quick-growing vines containing male and female flower heads. Its leaves typically have five lobes with individual plants showing wide variation in leaf size and lobe length.

Flower
The flower can vary in color from yellowish green to cream to white. Flowers appear soon after the vine emerges. The flowers are monoecious, that is, individual flowers are either male or female, but both sexes can be found on the same plant. Male flowers appear in open clusters while females flowers, distinguished by a swollen base, usually appear individually. The plant is self-fertile, i.e. pollen from the male flowers can fertilise the female flowers on the same plant; pollination is by insects.

Fruit

The fruit is longer than it is wide, 5–6 cm in diameter and 15–20 cm long, and covered in prickles of variable density, up to 1 cm long but without hooks. Unripe fruit are bright green, ripening to yellow. The fruit swells as it ripens until finally rupturing and releasing the large seeds. Fruit begin to form in late winter and ripen by early summer.

Seeds and germination
Seeds of Marah macrocarpa are large, hard, and very smooth. Southern California manroot has larger, longer seeds than the other manroot species except for Marah horridus. Fruits usually hold four or more seeds. Seeds sprout in the cool wetness of late winter. Seeds have an intriguing germination process. The initial shoot emerges from the seed and grows downward into the earth. This shoot then splits, one part beginning to swell and form the tuber, while the second part grows back to the surface and becomes the vine.

Taxonomy
Three varieties were formerly recognised:
Marah macrocarpa var. macrocarpas
Marah macrocarpa var. major 
Marah macrocarpa var. micrantha

Distribution
The plant is native to Southern California and Baja California. Its range extends from the Transverse Ranges and Channel Islands through the Peninsular Ranges.

It will tolerate a variety of soil types and acidities, but it requires seasonally moist soil. Vines can grow in full-sun to partially shaded conditions. It emerges soon after winter rains begin, grows until late spring, and dies back completely in the heat and dryness of summer.

Uses
All parts of the plant have a bitter taste (this is the meaning of the genus name Marah, which comes from Hebrew). Despite this, the leaves have been used as a vegetable. The large tuber of the manroot can be processed for a soap-like extract.

References

External links
UC CalPhotos gallery: Marah macrocarpa

Cucurbitoideae
Flora of California
Flora of Baja California
Flora without expected TNC conservation status